Ana Torfs (born in 1963, Mortsel) is a Belgian visual artist.

In her installations she uses a wide range of reproducible media, including slide projections, audio, photographs, prints, video, tapestries, and film.

Life 
Torfs studied communication science at the University of Leuven and film and video at the Sint-Lukas University College of Art and Design in Brussels. 
Torfs has lived and worked in Brussels since 1986. 

She has participated in numerous international group exhibitions including the 8th Contour Biennial  in Mechelen in 2017, the Parasophia International Festival of Contemporary Culture in Kyoto, 2015, the 1st International Biennial of Contemporary Art of Cartagena de Indias in 2014, the Sharjah Biennial in 2013, the Manifesta 9 in Genk in 2012, the 2nd La Biennale de Montreal in 2000 and the 3rd Lyon Biennale of Contemporary Art in 1995. In 2004 she was invited by the Dia Art Foundation in New York to create a web project. In 2004, A Prior Magazine 10 was dedicated to the work of Ana Torfs.

References

External links 
 

1963 births
Living people
20th-century Belgian women artists
21st-century Belgian women artists
People from Mortsel
Women video artists
KU Leuven alumni